The women's 800 metres event at the 2007 Asian Athletics Championships was held in Amman, Jordan on July 26.

Results

References
Final results

2007 Asian Athletics Championships
800 metres at the Asian Athletics Championships
2007 in women's athletics